The 1991–92 season was the most successful season in the history of KK Partizan. Partizan took the title of European champion and also won the Yugoslav League and the Yugoslav Cup.

Players

Roster

YUBA League

Standings

Final

European League

Second round

Regular season

Group B 

* Due to ongoing Yugoslav Wars, the three former Yugoslavian teams were forced to play all their home games outside their countries. All of them chose cities in Spain as the substitute home courts: eventual winner Partizan played in Fuenlabrada, title holder Slobodna Dalmacija in A Coruña and Cibona in Puerto Real.

Quarterfinal

Final Four

Semifinal

Final

References

External links
 Official website

1991–92
1991–92 in Yugoslav basketball
1991–92 in European basketball